Draegerman Courage is a 1937 American drama film directed by Louis King and written by Anthony Coldeway. The film stars Jean Muir, Barton MacLane, Henry O'Neill, Robert Barrat, Addison Richards and Helen MacKellar. The film was released by Warner Bros. on May 15, 1937.

Plot

Cast         
Jean Muir as Ellen Haslett
Barton MacLane as Andrew Beaupre
Henry O'Neill as Dr. Thomas Haslett
Robert Barrat as Martin Crane
Addison Richards as John McNally
Helen MacKellar as Mrs. Mary Haslett
Gordon Oliver as Pete Lawson
Joseph Crehan as Dr. Stuart Hunter
Priscilla Lyon as Suzanne Haslett
Walter Miller as Maxwell
Herbert Heywood as	Steve
Ben Hendricks Jr. as Captain Harper

References

External links 
 

1937 films
Warner Bros. films
American drama films
1937 drama films
Films directed by Louis King
American black-and-white films
1930s English-language films
1930s American films